Keystone Watch Company may refer to:

 The Keystone Watch Case Co.
 Keystone Standard Watch Co.